This page lists the World Best Year Performance in the year 2009 in both the men's and the women's hammer throw. The main event during this season were the 2009 World Athletics Championships in Berlin, Germany, where the final of the men's competition was held on August 17, 2009. The women had their final five days later, on August 22, 2009.

Men

Records

2009 World Year Ranking

Women

Records

2009 World Year Ranking

References
tilastopaja
IAAF
apulanta

2009
Hammer Throw Year Ranking, 2009